Colonel Richard Augustus Warren (1705–1775), also known as Sir Richard Warren, was an Irish Jacobite soldier who served in the French Irish Brigade and in the Jacobite rising of 1745. He led the naval mission to rescue Charles Edward Stuart from Scotland in 1746.

Warren was born at Corduff, the son of John Warren and Mary Jones. The family's financial situation compelled Warren to emigrate to France, where he briefly worked as a merchant in Marseilles. In 1744 he became a volunteer captain in the French army, joining an Irish regiment and fighting at the Battle of Fontenoy. He was commissioned by Louis XV to lead two ships of French reinforcements for the 1745 Jacobite rising, landing at Stonehaven in October 1745 with soldiers for the army of Prince Charles, the Young Pretender. Charles promoted Warren to Colonel after observing his construction of battery defences at Perth and Warren became aide-de-camp to General Lord George Murray. He was present at the Siege of Carlisle before returning to France to source further reinforcements. 

Following the Jacobite defeat at the Battle of Culloden, Warren volunteered to lead the mission to rescue Prince Charles from Scotland. Departing from Saint-Malo with two French ships, Le Prince de Conti and L’Heureux, he successfully collected the Prince and several other Jacobites at Loch nan Uamh in the Sound of Arisaig on 19 September 1746. Warren's ships landed at Roscoff in north west France on 10 October 1746. On 3 November 1746 James Francis Edward Stuart made Warren a baronet in the Jacobite peerage for "gallant service"; however he was only allowed to use this title publicly after 1751.

Warren returned to French service and became aide-de-camp to Marshall Maurice de Saxe. In 1750 he was made "brigadier general of the English troops" as a reward for his loyalty to the Jacobite cause. On the outbreak of the Seven Years' War in 1756 he was appointed brigadier of infantry in the French army and was given command of the Irish Brigade. In 1762 he became a Maréchal de camp and soon after a French subject. He died unmarried and heavily in debt in 1775, having unsuccessfully petitioned the Stuarts for a Jacobite peerage.

References

1705 births
1775 deaths
18th-century Irish people
Baronets in the Jacobite peerage
French military personnel of the Seven Years' War
Irish emigrants to France
Irish Jacobites
Irish soldiers in the French Army
Jacobite military personnel of the Jacobite rising of 1745